Below are the results for season 15 (XV) of the World Poker Tour (2016–17).

A notable occurrence happened at the 14th event of the season, the WPT Playground, which saw Ema Zajmovic became the first woman to win an open WPT event.

Results

Canadian Spring Championship

 Casino: Playground Poker Club, Kahnawake, Quebec
 Buy-in: CAD$3,500
 7-Day Event: April 20-May 5, 2016
 Number of Entries: 417
 Total Prize Pool: CAD$1,293,768
 Number of Payouts: 54

WPT Amsterdam

 Casino: Holland Casino, Amsterdam, Netherlands
 Buy-in: €3,300
 5-Day Event: May 10-14, 2016
 Number of Entries: 318
 Total Prize Pool: €911,880
 Number of Payouts: 36

WPT Choctaw

 Casino: Choctaw Casino Resort, Durant, Oklahoma
 Buy-in: $3,700
 5-Day Event: July 29-August 2, 2016
 Number of Entries: 1,066
 Total Prize Pool: $3,619,070
 Number of Payouts: 109

Legends of Poker

 Casino: The Bicycle Hotel & Casino, Bell Gardens, California
 Buy-in: $4,000
 6-Day Event: August 27-September 1, 2016
 Number of Entries: 687
 Total Prize Pool: $2,465,643
 Number of Payouts: 72

Borgata Poker Open

 Casino: Borgata Hotel Casino & Spa, Atlantic City, New Jersey
 Buy-in: $3,500
 6-Day Event: September 18-23, 2016
 Number of Entries: 1,179
 Total Prize Pool: $3,773,979
 Number of Payouts: 110

WPT Maryland Live!

 Casino: Maryland Live! Casino, Hanover, Maryland
 Buy-in: $3,500
 5-Day Event: October 1-5, 2016
 Number of Entries: 554
 Total Prize Pool: $1,772,800
 Number of Payouts: 63

bestbet Bounty Scramble

 Casino: bestbet Jacksonville, Jacksonville, Florida
 Buy-in: $5,000
 5-Day Event: October 14-18, 2016
 Number of Entries: 379
 Total Prize Pool: $1,762,350
 Number of Payouts: 48

WPT UK

 Casino: Dusk Till Dawn Poker & Casino, Nottingham, United Kingdom
 Buy-in: £2,200
 7-Day Event: October 31-November 6, 2016
 Number of Entries: 522
 Total Prize Pool: £1,044,000
 Number of Payouts: 54

WPT Montreal

 Casino: Playground Poker Club, Kahnawake, Quebec
 Buy-in: CAD$3,850
 7-Day Event: November 11-17, 2016
 Number of Entries: 648
 Total Prize Pool: CAD$2,199,960
 Number of Payouts: 81

WPT Caribbean

 Casino: Hard Rock Hotel & Casino, Punta Cana, Dominican Republic
 Buy-in: $5,000
 5-Day Event: November 19-23, 2016
 Number of Entries: 323
 Total Prize Pool: $1,456,892
 Number of Payouts: 36

WPT Prague

 Casino: Hotel Grandior, Prague, Czech Republic
 Buy-in: €3,300
 5-Day Event: December 2-6, 2016
 Number of Entries: 167
 Total Prize Pool: €551,100
 Number of Payouts: 21

Five Diamond World Poker Classic

 Casino: Bellagio Resort & Casino, Las Vegas, Nevada
 Buy-in: $10,400
 6-Day Event: December 5-10, 2016
 Number of Entries: 791
 Total Prize Pool: $7,672,700
 Number of Payouts: 72

Borgata Winter Poker Open

 Casino: Borgata Hotel & Casino, Atlantic City, New Jersey
 Buy-in: $3,500
 6-Day Event: January 29-February 3, 2017
 Number of Entries: 1,312
 Total Prize Pool: $4,199,712
 Number of Payouts: 130

WPT Playground

 Casino: Playground Poker Club, Kahnawake, Quebec
 Buy-in: $3,500
 6-Day Event: February 10-15, 2017
 Number of Entries: 380
 Total Prize Pool: $1,179,520
 Number of Payouts: 48
 Note: Zajmovic became the first woman to win an open WPT event.

Fallsview Poker Classic

 Casino: Fallsview Casino, Niagara Falls, Ontario
 Buy-in: $5,000
 3-Day Event: February 22-24, 2017
 Number of Entries: 489
 Total Prize Pool: $2,229,954
 Number of Payouts: 63

L.A. Poker Classic

 Casino: Commerce Casino, Commerce, California
 Buy-in: $10,000
 6-Day Event: February 25-March 2, 2017
 Number of Entries: 521
 Total Prize Pool: $5,001,600
 Number of Payouts: 66

Bay 101 Shooting Star

 Casino: Bay 101, San Jose, California
 Buy-in: $7,500
 5-Day Event: March 6-10, 2017
 Number of Entries: 806
 Total Prize Pool: $5,722,600
 Number of Payouts: 81

WPT Rolling Thunder

 Casino: Thunder Valley Casino Resort, Lincoln, California
 Buy-in: $3,500
 5-Day Event: March 11-15, 2017
 Number of Entries: 421
 Total Prize Pool: $1,347,200
 Number of Payouts: 53

Seminole Hard Rock Poker Showdown

 Casino: Seminole Hard Rock Hotel and Casino, Hollywood, Florida
 Buy-in: $3,500
 6-Day Event: March 31-April 5, 2017
 Number of Entries: 1,207
 Total Prize Pool: $3,862,400
 Number of Payouts: 151

Seminole Hard Rock Poker Finale

 Casino: Seminole Hard Rock Hotel and Casino, Hollywood, Florida
 Buy-in: $10,000
 5-Day Event: April 2-6, 2017
 Number of Entries: 349
 Total Prize Pool: $3,315,500
 Number of Payouts: 44

WPT Tournament of Champions

 Casino: Seminole Hard Rock Hotel and Casino, Hollywood, Florida
 Buy-in: $15,000
 3-Day Event: April 7-9, 2017
 Number of Entries: 66
 Total Prize Pool: $1,090,000
 Number of Payouts: 9

Player of the Year

References

External links
Official site

World Poker Tour
2016 in poker
2017 in poker